Chrysaperda is a genus of longhorn beetles of the subfamily Lamiinae, containing the following species:

 Chrysaperda circumcincta (Pascoe, 1859)
 Chrysaperda collaris Pascoe, 1888
 Chrysaperda metallica Bates, 1881

References

Hemilophini